La Conejera Hill is a  high hill located in the north of Bogotá, Colombia. It is an extended hill in a south-north direction, occupying the area between Calles 170 and 200, and Carreras 80 and 90. It borders the Thomas van der Hammen Natural Reserve, and is one of the sources of water recharge for wetland of La Conejera and other areas in the north of Bogotá. According to the District Environment Secretariat, La Conejera Hill is "one of the most important protected areas of District land in the city", due to its proximity to the urban area. There is a residential complex and multiple houses on the hill, in addition to the Antares Naval Club.

Recent years 
The resolution of 20 November 2014 of the District Environment Secretariat expanded the protected area of La Conejera Hill. Likewise, violations have been reported against the protected area of the hill, such as the deposit of construction debris, tires, and plastic waste, among others. In July 2015 alone, the local Suba mayor's office imposed 37 sanctions against the invaders.

References

External links 

Geography of Bogotá
Two-thousanders
Hills of Colombia